Chesley Burnett "Sully" Sullenberger III (born January 23, 1951) is a retired American fighter pilot, diplomat, and airline pilot best known for his heroism as captain of US Airways Flight 1549 that he ditched in the Hudson River in 2009 after both engines were disabled by a bird strike. All 155 people aboard survived. Sullenberger became an outspoken advocate for aviation safety and has helped develop new protocols for airline safety. He served as the co-chairman, along with his co-pilot on Flight 1549, Jeffrey Skiles, of the Experimental Aircraft Association (EAA)'s Young Eagles youth introduction-to-aviation program from 2009 to 2013.

Sullenberger retired from US Airways March 3, 2010, after 30 years as a commercial pilot. In May of the following year, he was hired by CBS News as an aviation and safety expert.

Sullenberger is the co-author, with Jeffrey Zaslow, of the New York Times bestseller Highest Duty: My Search for What Really Matters, a memoir of his life and of the events surrounding Flight 1549, published in 2009 by HarperCollins. His second book, Making a Difference: Stories of Vision and Courage from America's Leaders, was published in May 2012. He was ranked second in Times Top 100 Most Influential Heroes and Icons of 2009, after Michelle Obama.

On June 15, 2021, President Joe Biden announced he would nominate Sullenberger as U.S. representative to the International Civil Aviation Organization (ICAO) with the rank of ambassador. He was confirmed by unanimous consent in the Senate on December 2, 2021 and served that role from February 3 to July 1, 2022.

Early life
Chesley Burnett Sullenberger III was born January 23, 1951, in Denison, Texas. His father was a descendant of Swiss-German immigrants named Sollenberger. He has one sister, Mary. The street on which he grew up in Denison was named after his mother's family. According to his sister, Sullenberger built model planes and aircraft carriers during his childhood; she says he became interested in flying after seeing military jets from an Air Force base near his house. He went to school in Denison and was consistently on the 99th percentile in every academic category.

When he was 11 years old, his IQ was deemed high enough that he was allowed to join Mensa International. In high school, he was the president of the Latin club, a first chair flutist, and an honor student. He was an active member of the Waples Memorial United Methodist Church in Denison. He graduated from Denison High School in 1969, near the top of his class of about 350. At 16, Sullenberger learned to fly in an Aeronca Champion 7DC from a private airstrip near his home. He said that the training he received from a local flight instructor influenced his aviation career for the rest of his life.

Sullenberger earned a Bachelor of Science degree in psychology and basic sciences from the United States Air Force Academy. He also earned a master's degree in industrial-organizational psychology from Purdue University in 1973 and a Master of Public Administration from the University of Northern Colorado in 1979.

Military service

Sullenberger was appointed to the United States Air Force Academy, entering with the Class of 1973 in June 1969. He was selected along with around a dozen other freshmen for a cadet glider program, and by the end of that year, he was an instructor pilot. When he graduated in 1973, he received the Outstanding Cadet in Airmanship award, as the class's "top flyer". Following his graduation with a Bachelor of Science degree and his commissioning as an officer, the Air Force immediately sent Sullenberger to Purdue University to pursue a master's degree prior to entering Undergraduate Pilot Training (UPT).

Following completion of his graduate degree at Purdue, he was assigned to UPT at Columbus AFB, Mississippi, flying the T-37 Tweet and T-38 Talon. After earning his wings in 1975 as a pilot, he completed replacement training in the F-4 Phantom II at Luke AFB, Arizona. This was followed by his assignment to the 493d Tactical Fighter Squadron of 48th Tactical Fighter Wing at RAF Lakenheath, United Kingdom, in the F-4D Phantom II.

Following his assignment at RAF Lakenheath, he was reassigned to the 428th Tactical Fighter Squadron of the 474th Tactical Fighter Wing at Nellis AFB, Nevada, again flying the F-4D. He advanced to become a flight leader and a training officer and attained the rank of captain, with experience in Europe, the Pacific, and at Nellis Air Force Base, as well as operating as Blue Force mission commander in Red Flag Exercises. While in the Air Force, he was a member of an aircraft accident investigation board.

Civil aviation career

Sullenberger was employed by US Airways and its predecessor airlines from 1980 until 2010. (Pacific Southwest Airlines was acquired by US Air, later US Airways, in 1988.) He holds an airline transport pilot certificate for single and multi-engine airplanes, a commercial pilot license rating in gliders, and a flight instructor certificate for airplanes (single, multi-engine, and instrument) and gliders. In total, he has more than 50 years and 20,000 hours of flying experience. In 2007, he became the founder and CEO of Safety Reliability Methods, Inc. (SRM), a firm providing strategic and tactical guidance to enhance organizational safety, performance, and reliability. He has also been involved in a number of accident investigations conducted by the USAF and the National Transportation Safety Board (NTSB), such as Pacific Southwest Airlines Flight 1771 and USAir Flight 1493. He served as an instructor, Air Line Pilots Association local air safety chairman, accident investigator, and national technical committee member. His safety work for ALPA led to the development of a Federal Aviation Administration advisory circular. He was instrumental in developing and implementing the Crew Resource Management course that was used by US Airways, and he has taught the course to hundreds of airline crew members.

Working with NASA scientists, he coauthored a paper on error-inducing contexts in aviation. He was an air accident investigator for an NTSB inquiry into a major accident at Los Angeles International Airport, which "led to improved airline procedures and training for emergency evacuations of aircraft." Sullenberger has also been studying the psychology behind keeping an airline crew functioning during a crisis.

Sullenberger was active with his union, serving as chairman of a safety committee within the Air Line Pilots Association.

He was a featured speaker for two panels: one on aviation and one on patient safety in medicine, at the High Reliability Organizations (HRO) 2007 International Conference in Deauville, France, from May 29 to 31, 2007.

US Airways Flight 1549

On January 15, 2009, Sullenberger was the captain of US Airways Flight 1549, an Airbus A320 taking off from LaGuardia Airport in New York City. Shortly after takeoff, the plane struck a flock of Canada geese and lost power in both engines. Quickly determining he would be unable to reach either LaGuardia or Teterboro Airport, Sullenberger piloted the plane to an emergency water landing on the Hudson River. All 155 people on board survived and were rescued by nearby boats.

Sullenberger said later: "It was very quiet as we worked, my copilot Jeff Skiles and I. We were a team. But to have zero thrust coming out of those engines was shocking—the silence." Sullenberger was the last to leave the aircraft, after twice making sweeps through the cabin to make sure all passengers and crew had evacuated.

Sullenberger, described by friends as "shy and reticent," was noted for his poise and calm during the crisis; New York City Mayor Michael Bloomberg dubbed him "Captain Cool". Nonetheless, Sullenberger suffered symptoms of post-traumatic stress disorder in subsequent weeks, including sleeplessness and flashbacks. He said that the moments before the ditching were "the worst sickening, pit-of-your-stomach, falling-through-the-floor feeling" that he had ever experienced. He also said: "One way of looking at this might be that for 42 years, I've been making small, regular deposits in this bank of experience, education and training. And on January 15, the balance was sufficient so that I could make a very large withdrawal."

The National Transportation Safety Board ruled that Sullenberger made the correct decision in landing on the river instead of attempting a return to LaGuardia Airport because the normal procedures for engine loss are designed for cruising altitudes, not immediately after takeoff. Simulations performed at the Airbus Training Centre Europe in Toulouse showed that Flight 1549 could have made it back to LaGuardia had that maneuver begun immediately after the bird strike. However, such scenarios both neglected the time necessary for the pilots to understand and assess the situation, and risked the possibility of a crash within a densely populated area.

Post-flight accolades and publicity

U.S. President George W. Bush called Sullenberger to thank him for saving the lives of the passengers, as did President-elect Barack Obama, who also invited him and the crew to join the presidential inauguration ceremony. On January 16, 2009, the United States Senate passed a resolution recognizing and honoring Sullenberger, Skiles, the cabin crew, the passengers, and the first responders involved in Flight 1549's emergency landing. The United States House of Representatives passed a similar resolution on January 26, 2009.

Sullenberger attended the presidential inauguration on January 20, 2009, where he and his wife met President Obama. On January 22, 2009, he and the rest of the crew of Flight 1549 were awarded a Masters Medal by the Guild of Air Pilots and Air Navigators. A ceremony for Sullenberger was held on January 24, 2009, in Sullenberger's hometown of Danville, California, where he was presented with awards including Danville's "Key to the Town", and was named an honorary Danville police officer. While in the Tri-Valley, Sullenberger decided to grant his first official interview to Jega Sanmugam of The Wildcat Tribune, the official student newspaper of Dougherty Valley High School, which his daughter attended at the time. In a special February 2009 edition, the Tribune published "Heroism & Humility on the Hudson," covering Sullenberger and the Flight 1549 landing.

San Ramon Valley Fire Protection District Chief Richard Price presented Captain Sullenberger with his district's highest award, the Medal of Valor, which has been given only a few times in the district's history. Sullenberger, Skiles, and Flight 1549's cabin crew—Doreen Welsh, Sheila Dail, and Donna Dent—were honored with a standing ovation during the Super Bowl XLIII pre-game ceremony on February 1, 2009. Sullenberger was awarded with honorary lifetime membership in the Seaplane Pilots Association. In 2009, Sullenberger was awarded the Founders' Medal by The Air League. Admirers of Sullenberger also started a Facebook fan site that, as of late February 2009, had half a million members.

A library book, Just Culture: Balancing Safety and Accountability was in Sullenberger's luggage left behind in the cockpit. When Sullenberger notified the library that the water-damaged book had been recovered, it made a point of waiving any late fees. Bloomberg presented Sullenberger with a new copy along with the Key to the City of New York.

Sullenberger threw out the first pitch of the 2009 Major League Baseball season for the San Francisco Giants. His Giants jersey was inscribed with the name "Sully" and the number 155—a reference to the 155 people aboard the plane.

On June 6, 2009, Sullenberger returned to his childhood hometown of Denison, Texas, to participate in the town's D-Day celebration and to give the commencement address for his alma mater, Denison High School, marking the 40th anniversary of his own graduation from the school.

Sullenberger also made an appearance in St. Louis, Missouri, on July 14, 2009, to participate in the Red Carpet All-Star Parade before the 2009 Major League Baseball All-Star Game.

On February 24, 2009, Sullenberger testified before the U.S. House of Representatives Subcommittee on Aviation of the Committee on Transportation and Infrastructure that his salary had been cut by 40 percent, and that his pension, like most airline pensions, was terminated and replaced by a PBGC guarantee worth only pennies on the dollar. He cautioned that airlines were "under pressure to hire people with less experience. Their salaries are so low that people with greater experience will not take those jobs. We have some carriers that have hired some pilots with only a few hundred hours of experience. ... There’s simply no substitute for experience in terms of aviation safety."

The Carolinas Aviation Museum in Charlotte, North Carolina, which will house a Miracle on the Hudson exhibit, announced on January 14, 2022, that it would be named for Sullenberger.

List of awards
 Tony Jannus Award (2018)
 EAA Freedom of Flight Award (2015, with Jeff Skiles) 
 National Air and Space Museum Trophy for Current Achievement (2010, with rest of Flight 1549 crew)
 Legion of Honour (Officer) (2010)
 Times 100 Most Influential Heroes and Icons (2009)
 Founders' Medal from the Air League (2009)
 Master's Medal from the Guild of Air Pilots and Air Navigators (2009, with Flight 1549 crew)
 Key to the City from New York City (2009, with Flight 1549 crew)
 Key to the Town from Danville, California (2009)
 Chris Matthews' Hardball Award (2009)
 Jabara Award (2009)

Subsequent career

In 2010, Sullenberger retired after 30 years with US Airways and its predecessor. His final flight was US Airways Flight 1167 from Fort Lauderdale, Florida, to Charlotte, North Carolina, where he was reunited with his copilot Jeff Skiles and a half dozen of the passengers on Flight 1549.

Sullenberger is an international lecturer and keynote speaker at educational institutions, corporations, and non-profit organizations about the importance of aviation and patient safety, high performance systems improvement, leadership and culture, risk and crisis management, life-long preparation, and living a life of integrity. He presented at the World Economic Forum in Davos in 2011, as well as the Swiss Economic Forum that same year.

He served as the 2010 Tournament of Roses Parade's Grand Marshal.

In 2011, as part of a fundraising effort, Sullenberger flew to the Carolinas Aviation Museum in Charlotte, North Carolina, where the aircraft he landed on the Hudson River is on exhibit.

In December 2010, Sullenberger was appointed an Officer of France's Legion of Honour.

In 2009 Sullenberger received the Air League Founders’ Medal from the Air League's patron, Prince Philip, Duke of Edinburgh, in 2009. He and the Flight 1549 crew received the Smithsonian National Air and Space Museum Trophy for Current Achievement in 2010.

With coauthor Jeffrey Zaslow, Sullenberger wrote the 2009 bestselling memoir Highest Duty: My Search for What Really Matters. In the book, Sullenberger also discusses personal matters, including his father's suicide in 1995, the Sullenbergers' struggle with infertility, and their decision to adopt.

Sullenberger's second book, Making a Difference: Stories of Vision and Courage from America's Leaders, was released on May 15, 2012.

In May 2011, CBS News hired Sullenberger as an aviation and safety expert.

From 2009 to 2013, Sullenberger and Skiles acted as the co-chairmen of the EAA's Young Eagles Program, which gives children the opportunity to experience flight and learn about general aviation. Since its inception, the program has flown over 2 million kids and is the most successful of its kind in history. Through their participation in the Young Eagles and service to aviation safety, Sullenberger and Skiles received the EAA Freedom of Flight Award in 2015.

In 2019 Sullenberger said that Boeing 737 MAX crashes "are demonstrable evidence that our current system of aircraft design and certification has failed us. These accidents should never have happened." He sharply criticized Boeing and the Federal Aviation Administration, saying that the overly "cozy relationship" between the aviation industry and government was evident in March 2019 when Boeing CEO Dennis Muilenburg lobbied President Donald Trump to prevent the 737 MAX 8 from being grounded.

Politics

In October 2009, it was reported that the Republican Party had approached Sullenberger about running against Democratic U.S. Representative Jerry McNerney of California's 11th congressional district in the 2010 elections. Sullenberger's publicist said that he had no desire to run for public office.

In late October 2018, Sullenberger wrote an op-ed in The Washington Post ahead of the 2018 mid-term elections, calling on Americans to vote "for leaders who are committed to the values that will unite and protect us," who have a "moral compass ... competence, integrity, and concern for the greater good." In a subsequent interview with Lawrence O'Donnell, Sullenberger elaborated his position, discussing his belief that voters should act as a check and balance in a partisan government. He also wrote that he has been a registered Republican for the majority of his adult life but has "always voted as an American.”

In February 2020, Sullenberger endorsed former U.S. Vice President Joe Biden for the presidency. In September 2020, he worked with Vote Vets and The Lincoln Project to create a commercial urging Americans to vote President Donald Trump out of office.

Ambassadorship
On June 15, 2021, President Biden nominated Sullenberger to be the U.S. representative to the Council of the International Civil Aviation Organization (ICAO), with the rank of ambassador. He was confirmed by a unanimous Senate on December 2, 2021. He presented his credentials to ICAO Secretary General Juan Carlos Salazar Gómez on February 3, 2022.

On June 23, 2022, Sullenberger announced he would step down as ICAO U.S. Representative effective on July 1.

Personal life
Sullenberger is married to fitness instructor Lorraine "Lorrie" Sullenberger, with whom he adopted two daughters, Kate and Kelly.

On December 7, 1995, Sullenberger's father killed himself by gunshot shortly after being released from hospital following major surgery. He had been suffering from depression in the face of a long and difficult convalescence ahead of him. He left no note. As a result of this, Sullenberger became a suicide prevention activist, having promoted National Suicide Prevention Week and National Suicide Prevention Lifeline.

In popular culture

Radio personality Garrison Keillor wrote "Pilot Song: The Ballad of Chesley Sullenberger III" for the January 17, 2009, edition of his radio variety show A Prairie Home Companion.

Sullenberger's speech before Congress concerning U.S. civil aviation is featured in Michael Moore's 2009 documentary Capitalism: A Love Story.

Sullenberger is referenced in the 2011 romantic comedy film Friends with Benefits. Throughout the film, Justin Timberlake's character repeatedly suggests to people he meets aboard planes that modern airplanes practically fly themselves, and that Sullenberger's feat was less impressive than it was portrayed, an idea for which he encounters incredulity and hostility. Mila Kunis's character is also seen reading Sullenberger's English Wikipedia article.

The 2010 song "A Real Hero", by French electronica artist College and the band Electric Youth, is about Captain Sullenberger and the Flight 1549 water landing. Frontman Austin Garrick was inspired to write the song by his grandfather, whose reference to Sullenberger as "a real human being and a real hero" became the song's refrain.

In 2010, Stephen Colbert, Jon Stewart, and Steve Carell released a comedy record called Everybody's Talking 'Bout Sully.

"Hudson River Runway", the March 14, 2011, episode of the TV series Mayday, documents the events around Flight 1549's emergency landing and includes interviews with several of its real-life participants. Captain Sullenberger is not interviewed in the show, but is portrayed in reenactments by actor Christopher Britton.

The 2016 dramatic feature film Sully was adapted from Sullenberger's memoir Highest Duty: My Search for What Really Matters. Directed by Clint Eastwood and starring Tom Hanks as Sullenberger and Aaron Eckhart as Skiles, it recreates the events around the Hudson River landing.

Sullenberger appeared as himself in a cameo role in the 2017 film Daddy's Home 2.

President George H. W. Bush's service dog Sully, who was assigned to Bush in June 2018 after the death of former First Lady Barbara Bush, was named after Sullenberger, and remained with the former president after Bush's November 2018 death, accompanying Bush's casket for its return to Washington, D.C.

Sullenberger is featured in the 2020 pilot of the Fox animated TV series Duncanville.

Sullenberger appeared in the 2022 documentary film Downfall: The Case Against Boeing.

See also
List of accidents and incidents involving commercial aircraft
Living Legends of Aviation
Tammie Jo Shults

References

External links

Sullenberger's official website
US Airways Flight 1549 NTSB report
Harry Walker Agency ; Sullenberger's speaker agency
Captain Chesley B. Sullenberger, III. HarperCollins

60 Minutes interview with Captain Sullenberger (requires subscription)
Riley, Duncan (January 15, 2009). "A320 Pilot Chesley Sullenberger’s Other Jobs: Accident Investigator and Safety Lecturer". TheInquisitr. Retrieved January 16, 2009.
 Twitter Moment - Sullenberger's recollections of Flight 1549, ten years on

1951 births
Living people
American aviation record holders
American people of Swiss-German descent
American United Methodists
Aviators from Texas
Commercial aviators
Experimental Aircraft Association
Glider pilots
Mental health activists
Officiers of the Légion d'honneur
People from Danville, California
People from Denison, Texas
Purdue University College of Health and Human Sciences alumni
Recipients of the Jabara Award
Survivors of aviation accidents or incidents
United States Air Force Academy alumni
United States Air Force officers
University of Northern Colorado alumni
Biden administration personnel
US Airways Group
Writers from California
Permanent Representatives of the United States to the International Civil Aviation Organization